Carlos Andrés Diogo Enseñat (born 18 July 1983) is a Uruguayan former footballer. A player of great physical strength, he operated as a defender or midfielder on the right side of the pitch.

He amassed La Liga totals of 120 games and six goals over five seasons, representing in the competition Real Madrid and Zaragoza. He also played professionally, other than in his own country, in Argentina and Belgium.

Diogo appeared for Uruguay in two Copa América tournaments.

Club career
Diogo was born in Montevideo. He started his career with River Plate Montevideo and Peñarol, moving to Argentina's Club Atlético River Plate in January 2005.

In July 2005, Diogo signed with Spanish giants Real Madrid as compatriot Pablo García, but found first team opportunities scarce. On 23 August 2006, the club decided to send him to fellow La Liga side Real Zaragoza on a season-long loan; the move was made permanent in April 2007, but Madrid agreed to take just €4,5 million instead of the initial 6 million with the condition the player did not join FC Barcelona in the future.

On 6 January 2007, Diogo was involved in a fight with Sevilla FC's Luís Fabiano after apparently stepping on the Brazilian's hand and insulting him, which led to the latter putting the former in a strangle-hold in the closing stages of the game. This incident was punished with a five-match ban to both players.

Due to a serious knee injury, Diogo missed the entire 2008–09 campaign, with the Aragonese now in the second division. He underwent a second operation in April 2009, being sidelined for a further eight months.

On 12 December 2009, with Zaragoza back in the top level, Diogo returned to action with a goal, but in a 1–2 league home loss against Athletic Bilbao. The player still contributed with a further 14 appearances, as the team managed to avoid relegation.

Diogo returned to full fitness in 2010–11, starting in all the league games he took part in (2,950 minutes of play) as Zaragoza again narrowly escaped relegation. He left the club in July, after failing to negotiate a new deal.

Diogo signed a contract with PFC CSKA Sofia in mid-January 2012, but requested to leave the Bulgarian side after only 15 days, which was conceded. In late September he returned to active football, signing with Zaragoza neighbours SD Huesca.

In June 2013, Diogo agreed to a one-year deal at Belgian Pro League's K.A.A. Gent, He was released in January of the following year, returning to Zaragoza in the summer.

International career
An Uruguay international since 28 March 2003, playing nine minutes in a 2–2 friendly match with Japan in Tokyo, Diogo represented the nation at the 2004 and 2007 Copa América tournaments.

Personal life
Diogo was the son of footballer Víctor Diogo, who also played for Peñarol and with some Brazilian clubs.

References

External links
 Argentine League statistics  
 
 
 
 
 

1983 births
Living people
Uruguayan people of Brazilian descent
Footballers from Montevideo
Uruguayan footballers
Association football defenders
Association football midfielders
Uruguayan Primera División players
Club Atlético River Plate (Montevideo) players
Peñarol players
Argentine Primera División players
Club Atlético River Plate footballers
La Liga players
Segunda División players
Real Madrid CF players
Real Zaragoza players
SD Huesca footballers
Belgian Pro League players
K.A.A. Gent players
Uruguay international footballers
2004 Copa América players
2007 Copa América players
Uruguayan expatriate footballers
Expatriate footballers in Argentina
Expatriate footballers in Spain
Expatriate footballers in Belgium
Uruguayan expatriate sportspeople in Argentina
Uruguayan expatriate sportspeople in Spain
Uruguayan expatriate sportspeople in Belgium